"Outlaw Man" is a song written by David Blue and recorded by the American rock band Eagles. The song was chosen by the Eagles for their second album Desperado as the song fits the theme of a Western outlaw gang of the album. It is the second single released from  Desperado after "Tequila Sunrise", and the eighth track on the album.

Background
Glenn Frey provides the lead vocals on this song, with the other members singing harmony on the chorus "Woman don't try to love me don't try to understand.  The Life upon the road is a life of an Outlaw man."

Billboard said it had a "strong, Western flavored country rock sound...and polished vocal harmony."

Personnel
Glenn Frey: lead vocals, acoustic guitar, piano, Wurlitzer electric piano 
Bernie Leadon: harmony vocals, lead guitar, guitar solo
Randy Meisner: harmony vocals, bass guitar
Don Henley: harmony vocals, drums

Charts

Other recordings
The song was also recorded by David Blue and released on his 1973 album Nice Baby and the Angel.

References

1973 singles
Eagles (band) songs
Song recordings produced by Glyn Johns
Asylum Records singles